DXSV (96.7 FM), broadcasting as 96.7 Muews Radio, is a radio station owned and operated by Sagay Broadcasting Corporation. It serves as the flagship station of Muews Radio network. The station's studio is located at 2/F, La Castill Bldg., Magsaysay St., Brgy. Zone 1, Digos, and its transmitter is located at Brgy. Soong, Digos.

References

Radio stations established in 2012
Radio stations in Davao del Sur
News and talk radio stations in the Philippines